Ali Mohammadlu (also Romanized as ‘Alī Moḩammadlū) is a village in Pain Barzand Rural District, Anguti District, Germi County, Ardabil Province, Iran. At the 2006 census, its population was 76, in 16 families.

References 

Towns and villages in Germi County